The Defence SA Advisory Board provides high-level strategic and policy advice to the Government of South Australia "to promote the growth of Defence and defence industries in accordance with South Australia’s Strategic Plan." Air Chief Marshal Sir Angas Houston AK AFC was appointed to chair the board in 2014, replacing General Peter Cosgrove AC MC in the position. The board was established in 2007 and meets six times a year. The board was preceded by the Defence Industry Advisory Board (DIAB), which was established in 2003.

Membership 
As of 2019, the Defence SA Advisory Board's membership includes:

Former members

References 

Advisory boards of the Government of South Australia
Australian defence policies